The following list is of languages used in the Eurovision Song Contest since its inception in 1956, including songs (as) performed in finals and, since 2004, semi-finals.

The rules concerning the language of the entries have been changed several times. In the past, the contest's organisers have sometimes compelled countries to only sing in their own national languages, but since 1999 no such restriction has existed.

Rule changes
From  until , there was no rule restricting the language(s) in which the songs could be sung. For example, in the 1965 contest, Sweden's Ingvar Wixell sang his song in English. After this, a rule was imposed that a song must be performed in one of the official languages of the country participating. This new language policy remained in place until .

From 1973 to  inclusive, participants were allowed to enter songs in any language.

In , the European Broadcasting Union (EBU), the contest organisers, reimposed the national language restriction. However, Germany and Belgium were given a special dispensation to use English, as their national song selection procedures were already too advanced to change. During the language rule, the only countries which were allowed to sing in English were Ireland, Malta and the United Kingdom as English is an official language in those countries.

From  onwards, a free choice of language was again allowed. Since then, several countries have chosen songs that mixed languages, often English and their national language. Prior to that, songs such as Croatia's "Don't Ever Cry", Austria's "One Step" and Bosnia and Herzegovina's "Goodbye" had a title and one line of the song in a non-native language. In , Poland caused a scandal when Edyta Górniak broke the rules by singing her song in English during the dress rehearsal (which is shown to the juries who selected the winner).  Only six countries demanded that Poland should be disqualified, and with the rules requiring at least 13 countries to complain, the proposed removal did not occur.

In , the Dutch entry "Amambanda" was sung partly in English and partly in a fictional language.

The entry which used the most languages was "It's Just a Game", which represented Norway in 1973. It was performed in English and French, with some lyrics in Spanish, Italian, Dutch, German, Irish, Serbo-Croatian, Hebrew, Finnish, Swedish and Norwegian. In , Bulgaria was represented by the song "Love Unlimited", which mainly had lyrics in Bulgarian, but with phrases in Turkish, Greek, Spanish, Serbo-Croatian, French, Romani, Italian, Azerbaijani, Arabic and English. The  Yugoslav entry "Pozdrav svijetu" was mainly sung in Croatian, but also had phrases in Spanish, German, French, English, Dutch, Italian, Russian and Finnish.

 only two countries have never entered a song in one or more of their national languages –  has never used Monégasque, its traditional national language, nor has  ever entered a song in the Azerbaijani language (although the aforementioned "Love Unlimited" contained a line in the language, and the  Azerbaijani entry "Mata Hari" contained a repeated phrase in the language).

Criticism

Languages and their first appearance
Languages are fully counted below when they are used in at least an entire verse or chorus of a song. First brief uses of a language are also noted.

Winners by language 

Between 1966 and 1972, and again between 1977 and 1998, countries were only permitted to perform in a official, national or regional language of their country. Since language restrictions were last lifted in 1999, only four songs in non-English languages have won: Serbia's "Molitva" in 2007 (Serbian), Portugal's "Amar pelos dois" in 2017 (Portuguese), Italy's "Zitti e buoni" in 2021 (Italian) and Ukraine's "Stefania" in 2022 (Ukrainian). Also, Ukraine's winning entries in 2004 and 2016 combined lyrics in English with Ukrainian and Crimean Tatar, respectively.

In 2017, "Amar pelos dois" became the first Portuguese-language song to win the contest, the first winner since 2007 to both be in a language that had never produced a winning song before and be entirely in a language other than English. Among all Eurovision winning entries, only Ukraine's were performed in more than one language.

2021 was the first year since 1995, and the first since language restrictions were last lifted in 1999, that the top three songs were all sung in a non-English language: Italian (first) and French (second and third).

Entries in imaginary languages 

Three times in the history of the contest, songs have been sung, wholly or partially, in imaginary languages.

Performances with sign languages 
Some performances have included phrases in sign languages on stage.

See also 
 List of languages in the Junior Eurovision Song Contest

Notes and references

Footnotes

References

Bibliography 
Eurovision Song Contest history. Eurovision.tv. Retrieved on 19 August 2007.
History. ESCtoday.com. Retrieved on 19 August 2007.
John Kennedy O'Connor (2005). The Eurovision Song Contest 50 Years The Official History. London: Carlton Books Limited. .
 
 
 
 
 

Eurovision Song Contest
languages